This is a list of military corps arranged by name.

Germany
 Cavalry Corps Schmettow (German Empire), a unit of the Imperial German Army during World War I
 Ersatz Corps, a unit of the Imperial German Army during World War I
 Guards Corps (German Empire), a unit of the Imperial German Army prior to and during World War I
 Guards Reserve Corps, a unit of the Imperial German Army during World War I
 Landwehr Corps, a unit of the Imperial German Army during World War I
 Afrika Korps
 Gebirgskorps Norwegen

Others
 Allied Rapid Reaction Corps
 Australian Corps
 Australian and New Zealand Army Corps
 British Cavalry Corps
 Canadian Corps
 Danish-Baltic Auxiliary Corps
 Desert Mounted Corps (formerly Desert Column)
 New Zealand Corps
 Reserve Cavalry Corps (Grande Armée), a cavalry corps of the Imperial French army during the Napoleonic Wars

Military corps by name